Jonathan Mellor (born 27 December 1986) is a British long-distance runner. He competed in the 3000 metres event at the 2014 IAAF World Indoor Championships. He first established himself in the marathon scene with his 10th place finish at the 2017 Berlin Marathon where he ran 2:12:57. He has a marathon personal best of 2:10:03 and was the British Marathon Champion in 2020.

References

External links
 

1986 births
Living people
British male middle-distance runners
British male long-distance runners
Sportspeople from Birkenhead
Athletes (track and field) at the 2014 Commonwealth Games
Commonwealth Games competitors for England
20th-century British people
21st-century British people
Athletes (track and field) at the 2022 Commonwealth Games